Durieux is a surname. Notable people with the surname include:

 Tilla Durieux (1880–1971), Austrian actress
 Frédéric Durieux (born 1959), French composer
 Bruno Durieux (born 1944), French politician
 Caroline Durieux (1886–1989), American lithographer